Thomas Menzies (March 30, 1870 – March 13, 1947) was a Canadian politician. He served in the Legislative Assembly of British Columbia from 1920 to 1924  from the electoral district of Comox, a member of the People's Party.

References

1870 births
1947 deaths